The cossack cross is a type of cross pattée used by cossacks, the Zaporozhian Army and the Ukrainian Ground Forces. It is frequently used in Ukraine as a memorial sign to fallen soldiers and as military awards.

It has also been adapted as part of the emblem of the Armed Forces of Ukraine, the State Emergency Service of Ukraine, the State Border Guard Service of Ukraine and the Security Service of Ukraine, and is depicted on the flags and coat of arms of several Ukrainian regions, districts and cities, like Konotop, Zinkov and Zolotonosha. The Memorial to Ukrainians shot at Sandarmokh uses a cossack cross. As of September during the 2022 Russian invasion of Ukraine, Ukrainian forces started to paint a white cossack cross on their vehicles as a way to distinguish themselves from the Russian forces, similarly to the Russia's own "Z", "O" and "V" symbols.

Examples

References 

Christian crosses
Cossacks
History of the Cossacks in Ukraine